"Make It Better (Forget About Me)" is a song written by Tom Petty of Tom Petty and the Heartbreakers and David A. Stewart of the Eurythmics. It was released in June 1985 as the third single from Tom Petty and the Heartbreakers' 1985 album Southern Accents.

Musically, it is an uptempo number that pays tribute to the Memphis Soul style, with heavy emphasis on horns and funk-inspired rhythm guitar. The music video continues in the Alice in Wonderland motif of "Don't Come Around Here No More" and riffs on the "model annoyed by flying insect with the face of the singer superimposed" as in the then-recent "You Might Think" video by The Cars.

Cash Box said it is the Petty's and Stewart's "full-blown shot at R&B" and that it has "Memphis horns, soulful backing vocals and an irresistible dance beat."  Billboard called it "jittery, uptempo, horn-based Memphis soul."

Chart performance

References

Tom Petty songs
1985 singles
Songs written by Tom Petty
Songs written by David A. Stewart
Song recordings produced by Jimmy Iovine
1985 songs
MCA Records singles